Van Eyck is a 271 km diameter impact basin in the Shakespeare quadrangle of Mercury. It is located at 43.22°N, 159.43°W and is named after the 15th century Flemish painter Jan van Eyck. Its name was adopted by the International Astronomical Union (IAU) in 1979.

Van Eyck lies on the southwestern margin of the even-larger Shakespeare basin.  The younger Mansur crater lies to the northwest of Van Eyck.

References

Impact craters on Mercury
Jan van Eyck